Phani Bhushan Chakravartti (1898 – 8 May 1981) was the first Indian cum Bengali permanent Chief Justice of the Calcutta High Court and was the acting governor of West Bengal.

Career
Chakravartti was born in British India in Dhaka. Before joining the Calcutta High Court, he worked as professor of English in Jagannath College and Ripon College, Calcutta (1920–1926). In 1945 he was elevated as a judge of the Calcutta High Court. Chakravartti became the Chief Justice of the court in 1952 after Sir Arthur Trevor Harries. After the sudden demise of Dr. Harendra Coomar Mookerjee in 1956, he also took charge for acting Governor of West Bengal for few months. Chakravartti retired from the judgeship in 1958.

Writings 
Chakravartti wrote a book named Morning Blossoms.

References

Judges of the Calcutta High Court
Governors of West Bengal
Chief Justices of the Calcutta High Court
1898 births
1981 deaths
Academic staff of the University of Calcutta
20th-century Bengalis
20th-century Indian judges
Academic staff of Jagannath University